Self-Portrait in a Convex Mirror is a 1975 poetry collection by the American writer John Ashbery. The title, shared with its final poem, comes from the painting of the same name by the Late Renaissance artist Parmigianino. The book won the Pulitzer Prize, the National Book Award, and the National Book Critics Circle Award, the only book to have received all three awards.

Published when he was approaching the age of 50, Self-Portrait in a Convex Mirror was a major breakthrough after a career marked by relative obscurity, and either lukewarm or outright hostile reviews.

Background

Ashbery developed an early, idiosyncratic, avant-garde poetic style that attracted little critical notice—and the few reviews he did receive were usually negative. His first collection, Some Trees(1956), was chosen by W. H. Auden as the winner of that year's Yale Series of Younger Poets Competition. Despite this, evidence suggests that Auden—whom Ashbery frequently described as his most significant literary influence—did not actually enjoy Ashbery's writing.

Ashbery adopted an avant-garde style for The Tennis Court Oath(1962) at the cost of brutally negative reviews. Critics derided the book as incomprehensible and absent of any redeeming qualities, which almost drove Ashbery to quit writing poetry altogether.

He was grouped with the so called "New York School", a loose collection of modern poets with ties to the contemporary art and new music scenes in New York City. The group included his close friend Frank O'Hara, as well as Kenneth Koch, James Schuyler, and Barbara Guest. Though Ashbery thought the label was ridiculous—he lived in Paris, not New York, from 1956 until the mid-1960s—it helped to raise his profile. His third collection, Rivers and Mountains(1966), was nominated for a National Book Award and received modest praise from critics.

Asked in 1976 about the widely held opinion that his early poems were “too difficult”, if not outright impossible to understand, he replied:

Having resigned himself to the idea that he would always be met with "this incomprehension" from the few readers he had, he said he decided to "make the best of a bad situation of someone who was destined never to have an audience"—though he realized the irony that, after Self-Portrait, he had in fact finally drawn an audience.

Ashbery and Parmigianino's painting

Ashbery first saw a copy of Parmigianino's Mannerist painting Self-portrait in a Convex Mirror in 1950. At that time, Ashbery was pursuing an M.A. in English Literature at Columbia University. Having no plans for the summer and dreading that he would fail his upcoming final exams, he decided on impulse to postpone the exams, return home to Sodus, New York, and visit O'Hara in Boston. On the train home from Boston, he read the July 16 New York Times and came across "The Magic and Mystery of Artist Parmigianino", a review of a new book on Parmigianino by the art historian Sydney Freedberg. The article included a reproduction of Self-portrait in a Convex Mirror, which had had such a profound impression on him that he wrote to friends about the "truly divine Parmigianino."

In 1959, Ashbery viewed the original painting at the Kunsthistorisches Museum in Vienna. He was struck by "the strangeness and perfection of the whole enterprise, and the dreamlike image of the beautiful young man", and especially its title lingered in his memory. During a 1973 trip to Provincetown, Massachusetts, he purchased an inexpensive portfolio of Parmigianino's artwork from the window of a bookstore. The painting stirred him into contemplation once again, and he "slowly began to write a poem about it."

Publication

The first edition was published by Viking Press on May 15, 1975. The edition ran to 3,500 hardcover copies and featured a blue, green, and black geometric design on the dust jacket. A party was held at Gotham Book Mart in midtown Manhattan to celebrate the publication. Two paperback editions were published the next year, by Penguin Books in the United States and Carcanet Press in the United Kingdom. It became Ashbery's first book published with Carcanet.

Ashbery dedicated Self-Portrait to his partner and later husband, David Kermani. It was his second dedication to Kermani, after Three Poems(1973), with many more to follow. After first meeting in 1970, they became lifelong partners.

Cover designs
The Penguin paperback cover features a glamorous photo portrait of Ashbery by Darragh Park. Journalist Thomas Vinciguerra described Ashbery's pose as if  in all hunky glory, hips slightly cocked", wearing a "windowpane shirt open to midchest" and "tight slacks [that] have no belt loops." Matthew Zapruder wrote that his look was a "simultaneously ill-advised and completely stylish ensemble." Susan M. Schultz said the "cheesy" cover resembled a somewhat "cheap romance novel, like the kind you'd see near the checkout counter of a drugstore."

The bold look contrasted sharply with the conservative, uniformly preppy style Ashbery had adhered to throughout the 1960s. David Lehman recalled that, when he met Ashbery in 1967, the poet typically wore "a tie and a jacket and he always looked very natty." According to Lehman, his change in style reflected the progress of the post-Stonewall gay liberation movement, as Ashbery could present himself as "more visibly and publicly who he was."

Parmigianino's painting was not reproduced in early editions, a decision lamented by the critic Fred Moramarco, who said readers would be better able to appreciate the "reverberations" between the two works if they could view them simultaneously. Moramarco pointed out that the painting and poem had been published side-by-side in the January–February 1975 issue of the magazine Art in America. Later editions of the book have incorporated the painting into the cover design.

Contents
The collection contains 35 poems, comprising a mix of new and previously published works; the latter had appeared in various American literary magazines between November 1972 and April 1975. A decade after its publication, 11 of its verse were collected as part of Ashbery's Selected Poems(1985). The entire book was included in his Collected Poems 1956–1987, published by the Library of America in 2008.

Poems
"On Autumn Lake" makes ironic use of "Engrish" in its opening lines:

Stephen J. Ross called these lines "a cringe-worthy parody of speech" and compared them with other instances from Ashbery's oeuvre of "orientalist" tropes in (purposefully) "bad taste", some more nuanced than others. Bonnie Costello quoted these lines—and, unlike the previous two critics, included "stop it! I will not"—as part of an analysis of Ashbery's relationship with the reader. The poet is "constantly testing his authorial power" and "will provoke the reader with perverse behavior, momentarily suspending the fact that the reader can veto by his indifference." But elsewhere, these instances of authorial "self-assurance" are counterposed and "repeatedly mocked by images of the reader's forgetfulness, lapses of attention, ultimate silence. ... The writer doesn't have mastery over the reader ... or even over his text, except insofar as he has preempted the reader's recalcitrance by including it."

Style
As with much of Ashbery's poetry, Self-Portrait was influenced by contemporary developments in modern art, particularly painting. Since his early career, he felt poetry lagged behind the other arts, and sought to appropriate the techniques and effects of avant-garde painting, such as Cubism's "simultaneity" and abstract expressionism's "idea that the work is a sort of record of its own coming-into-existence", though he emphasized that his method was not random "like flinging a bucket of words on the page, as Pollock had with paint."

Ashbery was receptive to the idea that his poems could be understood as works of Mannerism—the Late Renaissance style that included Parmigianino's eponymous painting—but only the "pure novelty" of early Mannerists like Parmigianino, not the artificiality associated with the movement's later period.

Interpretation
Critics generally described Self-Portrait as some of Ashbery's most accessible poetry, especially when compared to his more challenging, avant-garde work like the earlier collection The Tennis Court Oath(1962) or the book-length poem Flow Chart(1991). Nevertheless, attempts at interpreting—or even comprehending—the poems in Self-Portrait remain difficult.

Ashbery did not regard the collection as more accessible than his earlier work. In a 1976 interview with Richard Kostelanetz for The New York Times, he said the title poem only seemed "more accessible" because of its "essayistic thrust" but close reading would reveal it to be as "disjunct and fragmented" as his earlier poem "Europe", from  The Tennis Court Oath(1962). "It's really not about the Parmigianino painting," Ashbery said; the ostensible subject was merely "a pretext for a lot of reflections and asides that are as tenuously connected to the core as they are in many of my poems which ... tend to spread out from a core idea." Kostelanetz said Ashbery's "most profound heresy" was the belief "that a poem should remain mostly inscrutable, no matter how long or closely anyone studies it."

Although Ashbery refrained from imposing his own interpretation on the reader, he rejected the idea that his poetry was political. For instance, Stephen Paul Miller wrote an essay theorizing that "Self-Portrait" was an elaborate commentary on the Watergate scandal, noting the poem was first published by Poetry in August 1974—the same month Richard Nixon announced his resignation. Ashbery told Miller that the poem had "nothing to do with Watergate, and more importantly, it was written before Watergate happened," to which Miller replied it made "absolutely no difference" to him when the poem had been written. In Miller's recollection, Ashbery joked "So you're comparing me to Nixon? Someday you'll get yours," then asserted that his poetry was not political in nature.

Critical response

The initial academic and press reviews were generally positive, and especially praised the titular poem. Many critics described the collection as Ashbery's best work to date and among the best works of contemporary American poetry.

Harold Bloom's influence on other critics
Much of the early literary critic and peer opinion was heavily influenced by Harold Bloom, an early champion of Ashbery who had predicted the poet would "come to dominate the last third of the century as Yeats dominated the first." Bloom—a high-profile literary critic best known as the author of The Anxiety of Influence(1973)—had applauded Ashbery's early works and considered him as a "strong" or "great" American poet, a successor to Ralph Waldo Emerson, Walt Whitman, and Wallace Stevens. Bloom's review of Self-Portrait, published in The New Republic, was quoted in a blurb for the book's dust jacket:

References to Stevens were commonplace in early reviews of the Self-Portrait collection and, whether they reflected or rejected Bloom's interpretation, they demonstrated his influence in any case. Although Bloom raised Ashbery's profile, other critics have objected to his stewardship of Ashbery's reputation. In 1975, John N. Morris mocked the tone of Bloom's blurb as over-bearing and portentous, sarcastically calling him "solemn and tremendous as History Itself":

In Susan M. Schultz's reading, Bloom's reviews imposed his own ideas and denigrated any of Ashbery's qualities beyond or contrary to his Stevens-centered analysis. Schultz interpreted parts of Ashbery's poetry, beginning with "Self-Portrait", as veiled retorts to Bloom and other literary theorists who would narrowly categorize the bounds of his work.

In academic literary journals
In The American Poetry Review, Fred Moramarco—a poet and professor of English at San Diego State University—wrote that he had long considered Ashbery to be "a poet to be reckoned with" and a "painterly" innovator who had become the poetry community's "own liberating version of Jackson Pollock". The new collection marked, for Moramarco, a "culmination" of Ashbery's work thus far. He praised the range of Ashbery's style, which he called "unparalleled among contemporary writers," and singled out the title poem for praise: "I don't regard it a very risky prophecy to suggest that this poem will shortly be regarded as a masterpiece, a classic of its genre, as elegant and erudite a poem as has appeared in this country in very many years."

Richard Howard, writing for Poetry magazine, cautioned that Ashbery's poetry contained "long, radiant visions, cross-cut by the usual ... opacities of diction and association" that the reader "may like or loathe, depending," but he said "[t]here is no choice, however, about the title poem, and half a dozen others, which are, as everyone seems to be saying, among the finest things American poetry has to show, and certainly the finest things Ashbery has yet shown."

In the popular press
Writing for Harper's Magazine, the writer Paul Auster described Ashbery's method as a reversal of "no ideas but in things"—a William Carlos Williams phrase that represented, in his opinion, "a widespread tendency in twentieth-century American thought and literature." Although Ashbery, like his peers, "begins with the world of perceived objects, perception itself is problematical for him, and he is never able to rely on the empirical certitudes that nearly all our poets seem to take for granted." Auster found Ashbery's "utter faithfulness to his own subjectivity" more similar to poetry by 19th-century French Symbolists, like Charles Baudelaire, Arthur Rimbaud, and Stéphane Mallarmé, than to poetry by his contemporaries. Overall, Auster said Ashbery's previous works had "all been rather uneven" and Self-Portrait was "no exception": a mixed bag of "exquisite successes" like the title poem on the one hand and, on the other, "many bad poems" and "far too many passages in which he exploits his sensibility to the point where it serves as little more than an excuse for ironic evasion."

Reviewing the collection for Time magazine in 1976, Paul Gray wrote:

Awards
Self-Portrait in a Convex Mirror received three major literary prizes: the Pulitzer Prize for Poetry, the National Book Award for Poetry, and the National Book Critics Circle Award for Poetry. To date, Ashbery is the only writer working in any genre to receive a Pulitzer, National Book Award, and National Book Critics Circle Award in the same year. The achievement has often been described as the "Triple Crown" of American literature.

The National Book Critics Circle (NBCC)—at that time a two-year-old organization of 300 critics and editors—announced the winners of its first awards in January 1976. It marked not only the NBCC Awards' inaugural year, but the first American literary prizes awarded by a group of critics. The National Book Foundation announced its nominees for the National Book Awards in March; alongside Ashbery, the candidates in the poetry category were Richard Hugo, P.J. Lanka, John N. Morris, Leonard Nathan, George Omen, Carolyn M. Rodgers, and Shirley Williams. Ashbery was announced as the winner the following month. In May, Ashbery was announced as the winner of the Pulitzer. That year's jury—Anthony Hecht, Richard Howard, and Mark Strand—unanimously selected Ashbery, with Howard Moss, Howard Nemerov, and John Hollander on the shortlist. Hecht prepared the Poetry Jury's report to the Pulitzer Committee.

Given his earlier reputation as an inaccessible obscurantist, Ashbery was shocked by the accolades. The NBCC Award came as a "great surprise", he later said, though he was widely expected to win the Pulitzer months ahead of its announcement. Believing he could not possibly win both the Pulitzer and the National Book Award, he attended the latter ceremony. He later recalled that, after they announced his name, "I was caught in probably the only spontaneous photograph of me that exists."

Effect on Ashbery's stature
The collection's acclaim made Ashbery one of the preeminent American poets of his generation. According to Paul Auster, few recent books of American poetry had "provoked such unanimous praise and admiration," which was perhaps surprising given the "singularly bad press" for Ashbery's earlier work. While he had been recognized by a small, "fanatically devoted" following, he was more often dismissed as "obscure, meaningless, and willfully avant-garde" by "the lords of the literary establishment."

The art critic Hilton Kramer remarked in 1977 that Ashbery had "been elevated to an astonishing public renown" in the two years since the publication of Self-Portrait in a Convex Mirror. Kramer was reviewing new portraits of Ashbery by his longtime friend Larry Rivers, who had previously drawn portraits of Ashbery in the 1950s. Unlike the older portraits of Ashbery, Kramer said, Rivers's new paintings were "not so much portraits of a friend as portraits of a famous figure," which celebrated the poet's newfound renown by including lines from "Self-Portrait in a Convex Mirror" and Ashbery's next collection, Houseboat Days, into the portraits themselves.

By 1984, David Lehman said that Ashbery was "widely considered America's most significant contemporary poet" and that, since Self-Portrait in a Convex Mirror, "this allegedly hermetic poet has won a genuine and genuinely avid audience for his work." Lehman reported that Self-Portrait in a Convex Mirror had by then sold 36,000 copies in hardcover and paperback editions. In 1998, Nicholas Jenkins of The New York Times described Self-Portrait in a Convex Mirror as the work that "fix[ed] him in the poetic firmament—a strange position for one so devoted to mobility and restlessness. From that point, even his best critics began to celebrate him in nakedly chauvinistic terms as part of an 'American' line, stretching back to the Emerson of 'Circles'."

Years later, Ashbery developed mixed feelings about the title poem of Self-Portrait, finding it to be too much like an essay and too remote in style from the rest of his body of work.

In March 2005, the Academy of American Poets included it in a list of 31 "Groundbreaking Books" of American poetry. For National Poetry Month in 2014, the online culture magazine Flavorwire named it among the "50 Essential Books of Poetry That Everyone Should Read". Shortly before his 90th birthday in 2017, by which time he had written 28 volumes of published poetry, biographer Karin Roffman recommended "Self-Portrait" as one of the ten poems by Ashbery that newcomers to his writing should read first.

Notes

Citations

Sources

Ashbery's writing

Bibliography

Academic and literary journals

Newspapers, magazines, and websites

 Originally published as "Groundbreaking Books"; see archived link.
 Originally published as "Groundbreaking Book: Self Portrait in a Convex Mirror by John Ashbery (1975)"; see archived link.

 Also available via the Harper's Magazine archive at harpers.org .

External links
 Self-Portrait in a Convex Mirror entry at the National Book Foundation website
 Self-Portrait in a Convex Mirror at the National Book Foundation blog, including an essay on the poem by Evie Shockley and other information 
 "Self-Portrait in a Convex Mirror" – the title poem in full, as first published in the August 1974 issue of Poetry magazine

1975 poetry books
American poetry collections
English-language books
English-language poems
Poetry by John Ashbery
Pulitzer Prize for Poetry-winning works
National Book Award for Poetry winning works
National Book Critics Circle Award-winning works
Viking Press books
Works based on art
Works originally published in The New York Review of Books
Works originally published in The New Yorker
Works originally published in Partisan Review
Works originally published in Poetry (magazine)